The 1909 Michigan Agricultural Aggies football team represented Michigan Agricultural College (MAC) as an independent during the 1909 college football season. In their seventh year under head coach Chester Brewer, the Aggies compiled an 8–1 record, shut out eight opponents, and outscored their opponents by a combined total of 291 to 17.

Schedule

References

Michigan Agricultural
Michigan State Spartans football seasons
Michigan Agricultural Aggies football